Radell is both a surname and a given name. Notable people with the name include:

Renée Radell (born 1929), American painter
Radell Lockhart (born 1979), American football player and coach